HMS Mallow was an  sloop built for the Royal Navy, and later operated by the Royal Australian Navy (RAN) as HMAS Mallow.

Construction
Mallow was constructed by Barclay Curle at Glasgow in Scotland. She was launched on 13 July 1915.

Operational history

World War I
During World War I, the sloop was tasked primarily with minesweeping. On 31 December 1915, Mallow picked up the bulk of the survivors of the passenger ship  (which had been torpedoed the day before off Crete) and conveyed them to Alexandria. In 1918, Mallow rescued the passengers of the French mailboat , including future acting Governor-General of Madagascar Joseph Guyon, after the mailboat was torpedoed by a German U-boat. Mallow later received letters of commendation from the Admiralty and Guyon.

With the RAN
The sloop was transferred to the RAN in 1919.

Decommissioning and fate
Mallow paid off to reserve on 18 October 1919, was decommissioned on 20 November 1925, and sunk as a target on 24 April 1935.

References

Acacia-class sloops
Ships built on the River Clyde
Ships sunk as targets
1915 ships
Maritime incidents in 1935
Scuttled vessels of New South Wales